Trzeciewiec  is a village in the administrative district of Gmina Dobrcz, within Bydgoszcz County, Kuyavian-Pomeranian Voivodeship, in north-central Poland.

The village has a population of 520.

Near Trzeciewiec, there is a 320 metres tall guyed mast for FM-/TV-broadcasting, which was built in 1962.

References

Trzeciewiec